The Trophée des Champions is a French association football trophy contested in an annual match between the champions of Ligue 1 and the winners of the Coupe de France. It is equivalent to the super cups found in many other countries.

History

The match, with its current name, was first played in 1995, but the format in French football has existed since 1949 when the 1948–49 first division champions, Stade de Reims, defeated the winners of the 1948–49 edition of the Coupe de France, RCF Paris, 4–3 at the Stade Olympique Yves-du-Manoir in Colombes. The match is co-organized by the Ligue de Football Professionnel (LFP) and the Union Syndicale des Journalistes Sportifs de France (UJSF).

From 1955 to 1973, the French Football Federation (FFF) hosted a similar match known as the Challenge des champions. The match returned in 1985, but was eliminated after only two seasons due to its unpopularity. In 1995, the FFF officially re-instated the competition under its current name and the inaugural match was contested between Paris Saint-Germain and Nantes in January 1996 at the Stade Francis-Le Blé in Brest. The following season, the match was not played due to Auxerre winning the double. A similar situation occurred in 2008 when Lyon won the double. The match was initially on the brink of cancellation, however, the LFP decided to allow the league runner-up, Bordeaux, to be Lyon's opponents. Bordeaux won the match 5–4 on penalties .

The Trophée des Champions match is contested at the beginning or middle of the following season and has been played at a variety of venues. During the Challenge des Champions era, the match was in such cities as Marseille, Montpellier, Paris, Toulouse, and Saint-Étienne. From 1995 to 2008, the match was hosted three times at the Stade Gerland in Lyon. Other venues include the Stade Pierre de Coubertin twice in Cannes, the Stade de la Meinau in Strasbourg, and the Stade de l'Abbé Deschamps in Auxerre. 

On 12 May 2009, the FFF announced that the 2009 Trophée des Champions would be played outside France for the first time, at the Olympic Stadium in Montreal, Quebec, Canada. It has since been held in Tunisia, Morocco, the United States, Gabon, China, Austria and, most recently, Israel.

Matches

Results by club

Notes

References

External links

Official site 

 
Football cup competitions in France
France
Recurring sporting events established in 1949
1949 establishments in France